The Southeastern Conference first sponsored football in 1933. This is an era-list of its annual standings from 1992 to present.

Standings

References

Standings
Southeastern Conference